Swaledale is one of the Yorkshire Dales in the United Kingdom.  The name may also refer to:

Swaledale (sheep), a breed of sheep named for the Yorkshire dale
Swaledale Festival, within the Yorkshire Dales
Swaledale, Iowa, a small town in the United States
Swaledale (cheese), cheese made within the Yorkshire dale